Dollar Savings Bank of New York was a bank that operated in New York City between 1890 and 2004.

History
Dollar Savings Bank of New York was formed on June 23, 1890.

In February 1983, after it was on the verge of bank failure, the Federal Deposit Insurance Corporation and the New York State Banking Department arranged for a merger of the bank with Dry Dock Savings Bank to form Dollar Dry Dock Savings Bank.

On February 21, 1992, the bank and its 21 branches were seized by the New York State Banking Department with the Federal Deposit Insurance Corporation named as receiver. Emigrant Savings Bank bought 20 of the branches and the Flushing branch was purchased by Apple Bank for Savings.

In 2011, the headquarters building in the Bronx was listed on the National Register of Historic Places.

References

Banks based in New York City
Defunct banks of the United States
Bank buildings on the National Register of Historic Places in New York (state)
National Register of Historic Places in the Bronx
Banks established in 1890
New York City Designated Landmarks in the Bronx
1890 establishments in New York (state)
Defunct companies based in New York (state)
Banks disestablished in 1992
1992 disestablishments in New York (state)
American companies established in 1890
American companies disestablished in 1992